Prawn killer may refer to:

At least two species of slipper lobster in the genus Ibacus:

Ibacus alticrenatus
Ibacus peronii

Mantis shrimp

Animal common name disambiguation pages